The black-billed treehunter (Thripadectes melanorhynchus) is a species of bird in the family Furnariidae. It is found in Colombia, Ecuador, and Peru. Its natural habitat is subtropical or tropical moist montane forest.

References

black-billed treehunter
Birds of the Northern Andes
black-billed treehunter
Taxonomy articles created by Polbot